St Martin's Church is a part of the Church of England on Boundary Road in Plaistow, Newham, East London. It was built in 1894 as a mission church, with the foundation stone laid on 28 June that year by Henrietta Pelham-Clinton (née Hope), Dowager Duchess of Newcastle and widow of the 6th Duke of Newcastle - she was a major benefactress in the area and also funded the opening of St Thomas' Roman Catholic Church in Woodford the following year.

Until 1997 its parish hall was in timber, with a World War Two bomb shelter attached - that year the firm Cottrell and Vermeulen refurbished the hall and added a community building and housing. With the three churches of St Mary's Church, Plaistow, St Matthias’ Church, Canning Town and St Philip and St James’ Church, Plaistow, it formed part of the Parish of the Divine Compassion until 19 October 2017.

. The Parish of the Divine Compassion then ceased to exist, and three new parishes were formed:  1) St Matthias Canning Town,  2) St Philip and St James and St Mary's, Plaistow, 3) St Martin Plaistow.

From October 2017, the Divine Compassion parish was divided into three: St Philip's and St James and St Mary's was one parish. St Matthias became a second parish, and St Martin's became a separate parish for the first time in many decades.

There followed two years of interim ministry under the Rev Canon Ann Easter, and on 2 May 2019 Rev Canon Jeanette Meadway was collated, inducted and installed as Vicar of St Martin's.

In July 2019 regular Masses in Portuguese were started at St Martin's Church by Fr Marco Lopes, an assistant curate in the neighbouring parish of the Holy Trinity, East Ham. In March 2021 regular Masses in Spanish were also started. In two years, regular attendance on Sundays grew from 30 to 150 people.

The parish was in vacancy from the 3rd January 2022 until the 7th September, when Fr Marco Lopes was collated as vicar. At the same occasion, the Rt Revd Saulo de Barros, the former Bishop of the Amazon, was installed as assistant priest of the parish with the goal of furthering the work with Portuguese speakers.

On the morning of January 30th 2023, Vicar of St.Martin, Fr Marco Lopes passed away due to an unexpected clot on a major artery in the heart.Bishop of Chelmsford, Dr Guli Francis-Dehqani said: “ My thoughts and prayers are with Marco’s wife Mary Ann and their children, Eunice and Rafi. This is devastating news for them and for everyone at St Martin’s Plaistow and the Luso-Hispanic Mission where Marco led so ably and with a spirit of service to the community. He was known to many people in our diocesan family and was an inspiration to those who worked with him. His ministry was also achieving recognition at a national church level and helping to shape thinking beyond our diocesan boundaries.” The Archdeacon of West Ham, The Venerable Elwin Cockett said:
“Marco’s death has come as a huge shock to all of us who knew him and served alongside him. Under his charismatic leadership, St Martin’s became a remarkable trilingual church with three thriving congregations, worshipping in Spanish and Portuguese as well as English. His friends and colleagues will testify that in the relatively short time he was with us, he showed himself to be a brilliant pastor and leader. He was also a much loved friend to many. Please join us in praying for his family as they come to terms with this devastating loss.”

References

Church of England church buildings in Plaistow
1894 establishments in England
Churches completed in the 1890s